Puranjit Dasgupta (born 21 August 1982) better known by his stage name Mantra, is an Indian actor, film director and producer, who started his career as a Radio jockey. He is known for his portrayal of Bhaskar Bose in Spotify's detective thriller podcast Bhaskar Bose and  Genie in Disney India's broadway-style musical Aladdin He appeared in various Hindi films, notably Panipat (2019), High Jack (2018), Rebellious Flower (2016), London, Paris, New York (2012), Bheja Fry 2 (2011), Game (2011) and Tum Mile (2009). He is the founder of Mumbai based production company, Mantramugdh Productions.

He gained a name as a host, anchoring for TV shows like India's Got Talent, Comedy Circus, and Zara Nachke Dikha, and also hosted the Pro Kabaddi League, a Kabaddi league for the past seven seasons.

Early life 
He was born to Chandra Dasgupta, an actress who worked in Hindi cinema and Prabir Dasgupta, a book publisher. He spent his childhood years in Indore and did most of his schooling at Indore Public School, Indore. Before venturing into the media industry, he was in the hospitality business from 1996 to 2000 and worked as a front desk receptionist and manager for The Taj Hotel.

Career

Radio 

RJ Mantra started his career with Radio Mirchi, the India's first private FM station in 2001. He moved to Delhi in 2003 and joined Radio City, where he hosted Route 91. He then moved on to work with Red FM 93.5, where he also hosted Radio show, Mumbai Local. He took a break from Radio in 2012. He returned to Radio in February 2017 with 92.7 Big FM's radio drama Lamhe With Mantra, a fiction-based show based on a particular theme of romance for each day.

Films 
Mantra made his film debut as an actor with Vishesh Films' Tum Mile in 2009, where he appeared as the second lead Vicky. He went on to appear in Abhishek Bachchan starrer Game (2011), followed by Sagar Ballary's comedy film, Bheja Fry 2 (2011). He played the role of Nandu, a gangster in Hum Tum Shabana (2011) and a Paris-based sex toy shop owner in London, Paris, New York (2012).

In 2016's Rebellious Flower, a biopic of spiritual leader Osho Rajneesh, Mantra played the triple role of three spiritual guides who help Osho find enlightenment. The film was shot in real locations in rural Madhya Pradesh in Central India.

In 2018, he was seen in Akarsh Khurana's comedy film, High Jack, where he played a hijacker, Vinit. He portrayed the role of Najib ad-Dawlah in Ashutosh Gowariker's 2019 period film Panipat starring Sanjay Dutt, Arjun Kapoor and Kriti Sanon.

Television and web-series 
His first major TV appearance was Lagegi on UTV's Bindass channel in 2007. The show was later renamed Hass ley India. In 2010, Mantra co-hosted dance reality show, Zara Nachke Dikha with Jennifer Winget on Star Plus. He played Doubting Dev in a show called Mystery Hunters India on Discovery Kids. As a stand-up comedian, he participated in successive Comedy Circus.

As a wild card entry, Mantra participated in the sixth season of the celebrity dance reality show Jhalak Dikhhla Jaa in June 2013. He was evicted from the show after two weeks. He co-hosted reality TV series, India's Got Talent with Bharti Singh in 2013-2014.

Mantra played the main lead in the mythological drama series Narayan Narayan, which aired on Big Magic. His performance as Narad was well received by the audience. He also worked as Video Jockey for Channel V and has hosted several television programs, including First Day First Show, G-spot. He hosted the Pro Kabaddi League, a professional-level Kabaddi league for the past seven seasons.

Later, in 2015, he hosted Family Fortunes, an Indian TV game show based on the American game show Family Feud, aired on Big Magic. He also appeared on Life OK's Har Mard Ka Dard in 2016.

In 2017, he appeared on Balaji Telefilms's web series Boygiri, available on ALTBalaji. In 2020, he appeared in three ZEE5 web series —the rom-com series Phone a Friend,  the sci-fi thriller series Bhanwar, the thriller series The Casino. He also acted in MX Player's crime thriller series High and SonyLIV original series Shrikant Bashir.

Theatre 
As a theatre artist, Mantra has performed in more than 100 plays of Piya Behrupiya, a Hindi interpretation of Shakespeare's Twelfth Night produced by Atul Kumar's The Company Theatre. He performed this two-hour musical drama first at the Globe Theatre in London as a part of the World Shakespeare Festival in May 2012, followed by the performances in Paris, Canada and the United States in 2016. In 2018, he was praised across India for his performance as Genie in Disney India's hit Broadway style musical Aladdin, which instantly became a crowd favourite.

He has done several plays, including Sohaila Kapur's Ouch, Divya Arora's The Melody of Love, Infinite Theatre's The Resistible Rise of Arturo Ui and Rajat Kapoor's Macbeth.

Audio series and podcasts 
Mantra's MnM talkies is the audio wing of his production house MantraMugdh Productions. MnM Talkies specialises in audio dramas and has many shows varying from romance, drama, action, thriller to horror. Some of his shows include Kaali Awaazei, Love In The Time Of Corona, and Mine n Yours, Bhaskar Bose and Virus 2062.

He directed the detective thriller audio series Bhaskar Bose for the Spotify original, where he depicts the role of protagonist Bhaskar Bose. In 2020, Kaali Awaazein, a fictional 10-episode horror audio web series on Amazon's Audible Suno, was written and directed by Mantra, where Amitabh Bachchan gave his voice.  Kaali Awaazein was presented by Amitabh Bachchan in January 2020.

In March 2021, Mantra directed a new Spotify Original podcast, I Hear You, a paranormal audio series featuring Aahana Kumra, who plays a Delhi based detective Priyamvada Parmar. He directed another Spotify original, Darr Ka Raaz with Dr. Phobia, a psychological horror starring Rajesh Khera and Riya Deepsi, released in April 2021.

MnM talkies produced Virus 2062, a Spotify India's audio thriller voiced by Ali Fazal and Richa Chadha. It was directed by Mantra, which was released in September 2021.

Production and directions 

Mantra has directed and produced various films and shorts films under the banner of his production company Mantramugdh Productions. In 2017, his short film, Khatara, which portrayes the story of a simple small-town boy and his love for his car, won the Best Actor's Award at the 4th Bengaluru International Short Film Festival. Khatara was produced by Mantramugdh Productions in association with PitaraStudios and Purple Production.

Saudade, another short film produced by Mantra, won the Best Cinematography award at the 4th Bengaluru International Short Film Festival and was also selected in the Goa Short Film Festival and Bengaluru International Short Film Festival in 2019.

In 2016, Mantra produced and directed the short film, Deja Brew, featuring his mother. It was screened at the Filmingo International Short Film Festival, 5th Mumbai Short International Film Festival and 5th Delhi Short International Film Festival and Cineframe International Short Film Festival, Kolkata.

He made his debut in Bengali cinema with his first Bengali film ANA which is based on transgender, was released on OTT platform ZEE5. Ana was nominated for the award of 'Best actor in a leading role' at the Moscow Indie Film Festival.

Filmography

Feature films

{| class="wikitable sortable"
|+
|-
! Year !! Film !! Role !! Notes
|-
| 2009 || Tum Mile|| Vicky|| Second lead
|-
| 2011|| Game|| Ranbeer ||
|-
| 2011 || Hum Tum Shabana|| Nandu ||
|-
| 2011 || Bheja Fry 2|| Mantra ||

|-
| 2012 || London, Paris, New York || Monty ||
|-
| 2016 || Rebellious Flower|| Masto Baba, Pagal Baba, Magga Baba|| Biographical film of Rajneesh Osho
|-
| 2019||Panipat|| Najib ad-Dawlah || An epic war drama film

|-
| 2021||Rashmi Rocket|| Coach Tejas Mukherji || 
|}

 Web-series 

 Television 

 Dubbing roles 
 Live action films 

 Awards and recognition 
Mantra is a two-time winner of the Promax Award for his show Mumbai Local on Red FM 93.5. He was awarded the RAPA Award for Best Radio Jockey twice. In June 2011, PETA awarded him the "Hero to Animals" award for rescuing a parrot tangled in wires.

Mantra has also won the Best Actor award at the Bangalore Short Film Festival 2015 for his short film Khatara and at the 6th Indian Cine Film Festival 2018 for Ana. He was awarded the Best Radio Personality for 92.7 Big FM show, Lamhe with Mantra at The New York Festival Awards 2017.

 References 

 External links 

 
 
 I couldn’t be another Bharti -RJ Mantra at The Times of India''

Indian male television actors
Living people
Indian film actors
Indian television presenters
Masters of ceremonies
Indian stand-up comedians
Participants in Indian reality television series
1982 births